Peuerbach  is a town in Austria, in Grieskirchen (district) in the Austrian state of Upper Austria.

On the 6th November 2016 there was a vote on whether Peuerbach would be merged with the neighbouring municipalities of Bruck-Waasen and Steegen. The majority of the inhabitants of Peuerbach and Bruck-Waasen voted in favour, the majority of the inhabitants of Steegen against it. On 1 January 2018, Peuerbach merged with Bruck-Waasen, but maintained the name Stadtgemeinde Peuerbach.''

Population

Personalities
 Georg von Peuerbach (1423-1461), famous astronomer 
 Klaus Klaffenböck, sidecar racing world champion
 Doris Schmidauer, First Lady of Austria.

References

Cities and towns in Grieskirchen District